The 2011 Rhineland-Palatinate state election was held on 27 March 2011 to elect the members of the Landtag of Rhineland-Palatinate. The incumbent Social Democratic Party (SPD) government led by Minister-President Kurt Beck lost its majority. The SPD subsequently formed a coalition with The Greens, and Beck continued in office.

Parties
The table below lists parties represented in the previous Landtag of Rhineland-Palatinate.

Opinion polling

Election result

|-
|colspan=8| 
|-
! colspan="2" | Party
! Votes
! %
! +/-
! Seats 
! +/-
! Seats %
|-
| bgcolor=| 
| align=left | Social Democratic Party (SPD)
| align=right| 666,817
| align=right| 35.7
| align=right| 9.9
| align=right| 42
| align=right| 11
| align=right| 41.6
|-
| bgcolor=| 
| align=left | Christian Democratic Union (CDU)
| align=right| 658,474
| align=right| 35.2
| align=right| 2.4
| align=right| 41
| align=right| 3
| align=right| 40.6
|-
| bgcolor=| 
| align=left | Alliance 90/The Greens (Grüne)
| align=right| 288,489
| align=right| 15.4
| align=right| 10.8
| align=right| 18
| align=right| 18
| align=right| 17.8
|-
! colspan=8|
|-
| bgcolor=| 
| align=left | Free Democratic Party (FDP)
| align=right| 79,343
| align=right| 4.2
| align=right| 3.8
| align=right| 0
| align=right| 10
| align=right| 0
|-
| bgcolor=| 
| align=left | The Left (Linke)
| align=right| 56,054
| align=right| 3.0
| align=right| 0.4
| align=right| 0
| align=right| ±0
| align=right| 0
|-
| bgcolor=| 
| align=left | Free Voters (FW)
| align=right| 43,348
| align=right| 2.3
| align=right| 0.7
| align=right| 0
| align=right| ±0
| align=right| 0
|-
| bgcolor=| 
| align=left | Pirate Party Germany (Piraten)
| align=right| 29,319
| align=right| 1.6
| align=right| New
| align=right| 0
| align=right| New
| align=right| 0
|-
| bgcolor=| 
| align=left | National Democratic Party (NPD)
| align=right| 20,586
| align=right| 1.1
| align=right| 0.1
| align=right| 0
| align=right| ±0
| align=right| 0
|-
| bgcolor=|
| align=left | Others
| align=right| 25,757
| align=right| 1.4
| align=right| 
| align=right| 0
| align=right| ±0
| align=right| 0
|-
! align=right colspan=2| Total
! align=right| 1,868,187
! align=right| 100.0
! align=right| 
! align=right| 101
! align=right| ±0
! align=right| 
|-
! align=right colspan=2| Voter turnout
! align=right| 
! align=right| 61.8
! align=right| 3.2
! align=right| 
! align=right| 
! align=right| 
|}

Notes

References

 Rhineland-Palatinate State Statistics Office

2011 elections in Germany
2011
March 2011 events in Germany